Sir Vernon James Ellis (born 1 July 1947) was the chair of the British Council from 2010 to 2016.

Education
Ellis was educated at Magdalen College School, before going to Magdalen College, Oxford, to study Philosophy, Politics and Economics (PPE). He graduated in 1969 and became a Fellow of the Institute of Chartered Accountants (FCA) in 1973.

Career
Ellis worked at Accenture (formerly Andersen Consulting) from 1969, becoming a Partner in 1979, Managing Partner (UK) 1986–89, Managing Partner EMEAI 1989–2000 and International Chairman 2000–08. He was a Senior Adviser to Accenture 2008–10. Whilst at Accenture, he was involved with business school advisory boards at IMD, INSEAD and Oxford. From 2001 to 2005 he was Chair of the Prince of Wales Business Leaders Forum; Council, World Economic Forum, 1999–2001; Deputy Chair, Mayor of Seoul's International Business Advisory Council; UK private sector delegate, G8 Digital Opportunities Task Force, 2000–02. 

Ellis has been a director of FTI Consulting Inc. since 2012. He was Chair of One Medical Group from 2010 to 2019 and has been Chair of Martin Randall Travel since 2008.

In April 2010 he succeeded Lord Kinnock as Chair of the British Council.

Arts and philanthropy 
Ellis has been involved in many musical organisations, especially serving as Chairman of English National Opera 2005–12 (President 2012–). He was Chair of Classical Opera from 1996 to 2009 (currently President); Chair of the National Opera Studio 2012–19; Chair of the Leeds International Piano Competition, succeeding Dame Fanny Waterman, 2015–19; Trustee of the Royal College of Music 2006–10; former Trustee of London Music Masters, Sacconi Trust and the Kathleen Ferrier Award. 

From 2017 he was Chair of the Britten Pears Foundation, and following its merger with Snape Maltings in April 2020, Co-Chair of the merged entity – Britten Pears Arts. He is also Chair of Live Music Now, which since its formation in 1977 has provided over 80,000 interactive music workshops for over 2.8 million disadvantaged people throughout the UK. He is also a Trustee of the Royal Philharmonic Society. From 2012 to 2016, Ellis was Chair of HM Government's Arts and Media Honours Committee.

In 2015, he became the inaugural Chair of the Stop MS Appeal Board, an initiative of the Multiple Sclerosis Society which aims to raise £100m over ten years towards MS research; at the half-way point in 2020 when he retired from this role, the appeal had raised £50m. He has long been interested in ways to increase levels of philanthropy in the UK. He took part in the Philanthropy Review in 2011–12 and is currently on the Council of the Beacon Collaborative. Under its auspices he is leading a major initiative to bring new philanthropy into arts and culture through its impact on health, education, wellbeing and the community.

In 2001 he established the Vernon Ellis Foundation to channel his personal giving, and by 2020 the charity had distributed almost £9m. An early major donation provided the lead private support to the restoration of the London Coliseum. The focus now is on the impact that the arts can make on wellbeing, education and the community. Also, through his Foundation, he hosted around 80–90 concerts a year between 2005 and 2017 at his London home in support of musicians' and music organisations' development, and other fundraising events.

Honours and awards 
He was knighted for "services to music" in 2011, was awarded Fellowship of the Royal College of Music (FRCM) in 2012; Hon Fellow Trinity Laban Conservatoire, 2011; Hon DLit Goldsmiths, University of London, 2011; Hon DSc Queen's University Belfast, 2012; Hon LLD Warwick University, 2014; Beacon Fellow for Cultural Philanthropy, 2013; Association of British Orchestras Award, 2014; Honorary Bencher of the Middle Temple from 2017.

References

1947 births
Living people
People from Leicestershire
English people of Welsh descent
People educated at Magdalen College School, Oxford
Alumni of Magdalen College, Oxford
Fellows of Green Templeton College, Oxford
People associated with the Royal Academy of Music
Knights Bachelor
People of the British Council